Camasarye II Philoctenus or Comosarye was a daughter of Spartocus V and a Spartocid queen of the Bosporan Kingdom from 180-160/150 BC. She was the wife of her cousin Paerisades III and a granddaughter of Leucon II. She co-ruled with Paerisades III.

Reign
Camasarye is presumably the namesake of one of her ancestors named Comosarye, another Bosporan queen of relative significance who also married her cousin named Paerisades. After the death of her grandfather Leucon II, she was presumably too young to rule as heir, so Hygiaenon, a prominent member of the aristocracy, ruled as Archon and probably as regent presumably until she or her father were of age. He ruled until 200 BC, at which point her father Spartocus became king and ruled until 180 BC.

Camasarye became queen in 180 BC and was very politically active throughout her reign as queen being mentioned in many inscriptions, such as with her and her husband Paerisades being honored at Delphi for the treatment of foreigners in their kingdom. At some point during her reign, she took the surname "Philotecnus" which means "children-adoring" possibly to show a strong bond with her children. She bore presumably two sons to Paerisades, Paerisades IV and Paerisades V, the last kings of the Bosporan Kingdom.

Prior to 160 BC, Camasarye married Argotes, who may have been a Scythian prince and a son of an individual called Isanthus.

Succession
Camasarye was succeeded by her presumably eldest son Paerisades IV in 150 BC, who took the surname "Philometor" perhaps to show a strong relationship with his mother. He was then later succeeded by Paerisades V in 125 BC, the last Spartocid ruler of the Bosporan Kingdom.

References 

Monarchs of the Bosporan Kingdom
2nd-century BC rulers in Europe
Ancient queens regnant
2nd-century BC women rulers
Spartocid dynasty